This is a list of North American Soccer League stadiums. Some of these stadiums for the North American Soccer League teams are soccer-specific stadiums; others are multi-purpose stadiums shared with other teams.

NASL stadiums
The following list includes former venues and stadiums where promotional matches have been played.

See also
 List of Major League Soccer stadiums
 Soccer-specific stadium

References

 
NASL
NASL